Shri Gopinathji Maharaj (~1212 – Death unknown) is the founder of the Maharaja Family of Gujarati Nagar Brahmin Family. His birth is celebrated throughout northern Gujarat by the Patel community in the Gujarati town of Chanasma where one of the elderly living member of the Maharaja family visits and blesses each new born, also delivering lectures and sharing his worldly knowledge.

People from Gujarat
1210s births
Year of death unknown